Salar Azimi (born 21 September 1982) is an Iranian asylum seeker who fled to the Netherlands when he was 13 years old. There he became a businessman and a millionaire.

Business
When Azimi came to the Netherlands, he first lived for a few years with his parents and brother Sasan in a small room in an asylum seekers' center. He then went to school in Zeelandic Flanders. After graduating he built up a diverse business empire together with Sasan: telephone company Trendy Telecom, computer company Trendy Computers, later also a hotel, a party boat and its own Belgian amateur football club: K. Patro Eisden Maasmechelen. They became multimillionaires. 

Azimi married with Annika de Ruijsscher. They have two daughters: Princess and Isabelle. They live in the Elderschans castle in Aardenburg. He also owns several expensive and exclusive cars.

Azimi featured in several Belgian and Dutch television programs, including Belgian program  and Dutch program Waar doen ze het van? and in talk show .

Arrest
On March 9, 2021, Azimi was arrested together with his brother Sasan, they are suspected of money laundering, mortgage fraud and forgery.

References

Iranian businesspeople
Date of birth missing (living people)
Place of birth missing (living people)
Iranian refugees
Living people
Iranian emigrants to the Netherlands
1982 births